2018 World Taekwondo Grand Slam - Open Qualification Tournament I is an international G-2 taekwondo tournament which allows the winner to be seeded as 9th on the 2018 World Taekwondo Grand Slam bracket. It also allows the 2nd and 3rd placed athletes to qualify to the event. The event was scheduled for April 20-22, 2018 in Wuxi, China.

Medal summary

Men

Women

Medal table

References 

World Taekwondo Grand Slam
Grand Slam
World Taekwondo Grand Slam
International sports competitions hosted by China
Sport in Wuxi
World Taekwondo Grand Slam